Arambourgia is an extinct monotypic genus of alligatorine crocodylian from Europe. It was named in 1905 as Allognathosuchus gaudryi. It was made a separate genus Arambourgia in 1940. This was synonymized with Allognathosuchus haupti in 1990 (now known as Hassiacosuchus haupti), but later reassigned as its own genus once again in 2004. Arambourgia was likely to have been part of an early dispersal event of alligatorines from North America to Europe during the Eocene epoch. Arambourgia had non-serrated teeth and a deep orienirostral snout, unlike the flatter snouts of most other alligatorids.

Recent studies have consistently resolved Arambourgia as a member of Alligatorinae, although its relative placement is disputed, as shown by the cladograms below.

Cladogram from 2018 Bona et al. study:

Cladogram from 2019 Massonne et al. study:

Cladogram from 2020 Cossette & Brochu study:

References

Alligatoridae
Eocene crocodylomorphs
Eocene reptiles of Europe
Prehistoric pseudosuchian genera